The Advance Thresher/Emerson-Newton Implement Company buildings in Minneapolis, Minnesota, United States, are a pair of buildings designed by Kees and Colburn.  The two buildings are united under a common cornice and appear to be a single structure.  However, the two buildings were actually built four years apart.  The Advance Thresher Company building was built in 1900 and has six floors.  The adjacent Emerson-Newton Plow Company building was built in 1904 and has seven floors.

The architecture of the buildings was influenced by Louis Sullivan.  They are ornamented with terra cotta details that are more Classical Revival in nature.  The buildings were renovated into offices in the 1980s.  They are listed on the National Register of Historic Places for local significance in architecture for exemplifying the Sullivanesque style influencing large industrial and commercial buildings at the turn of the 20th century.

See also
 National Register of Historic Places listings in Hennepin County, Minnesota

References

Industrial buildings and structures on the National Register of Historic Places in Minnesota
Industrial buildings completed in 1904
National Register of Historic Places in Minneapolis
Industrial buildings completed in 1900
Buildings and structures completed in 1904
Agricultural machinery manufacturers of the United States
Allis-Chalmers Manufacturing Company